The Last Ride is a 2016 South Korean comedy drama film written and directed by Nam Dae-joong and starring Ryu Deok-hwan, Kim Dong-young and Ahn Jae-hong.

Plot 
Go-Hwan's father wakes up every morning for exercise. Soon, it is revealed that he wants to participate in a marathon with his son, who is in a wheelchair. Go-Hwan is worried, but his father wraps him with thick blankets and ties him to the wheelchair. Before finishing the marathon, the father collapses due to exhaustion and accidentally pushes Go Hwan down the road. An ambulance takes the father away. The father tries to tell about his son, who fell face down the cliff. Later in the evening, the news reports about Go-Hwan, who is found by a driver.

Go-Hwan's best friends Nam-Joon and Gab-Duk are shocked upon hearing the news. They find Go-Hwan's mother in front of the hospital. She tells them to come visit her son before he dies. They want to leave happy memories to their friend, so they kidnap him from the hospital and together, riding on a motorbike, they visit the ocean only to find that the beach is contaminated with toxic waste. They also find two headed fish.

Go-Hwan's mother scolds the friends, as it makes his condition worsen. Go-Hwan has been suffering from Lou Gehrig's disease. He soon learns that this is the truth and when his best friends ask him what his wish is, Go-hwan tells them that he wants to have sex for the first and last time in his life. He keep yelling about it in the hospital, and when his mother comes to his room, they pretend nothing happened.

Nam-Joon and Gab-Duk try to find a girl for their dying friend, but they keep getting slapped or beaten upon speaking with the girls.

Cast 
 Ryu Deok-hwan as Go-hwan
 Kim Dong-young as Nam-joon
 Ahn Jae-hong as Gab-duk
 Jeon No-min as Go-hwan's father
 Jeon Mi-seon as Go-hwan's mother
 Bae Jung-hwa as goddess
 Han Kuk-jin as homeroom teacher
 Lee Han-wi as Gab-duk's father
 Lee Byeong-hun as good-for-nothing senior

References

External links
 
 
 

2016 films
2010s Korean-language films
2016 comedy-drama films
South Korean comedy-drama films
2010s South Korean films